Sir Gerald Nigel Mobbs KStJ JP (22 September 1937 – 21 October 2005) was a businessman who was Lord Lieutenant of Buckinghamshire between 1997 and 2005. 

He was chairman of Slough Estates, a property firm founded by his grandfather, Noel Mobbs. He was the senior non-executive director of Barclays Bank from 1980 to 2003.

He was also the High Sheriff of Buckinghamshire from 1982 to 1983 and was a Knight of St John, a Justice of the Peace and was made a Knight Bachelor in the 1986 Birthday Honours. He was chairman of the council of the University of Buckingham between 1987 and 1998.

He married, in 1961, Jane Berry, who was a daughter of Lionel Berry, 2nd Viscount Kemsley; they had a son and two daughters. He died suddenly at the age of 68.

References

External links
Report of his death in the Telegraph

1937 births
2005 deaths
People from Buckinghamshire
High Sheriffs of Buckinghamshire
Knights of the Order of St John
Lord-Lieutenants of Buckinghamshire
Knights Bachelor
People associated with the University of Buckingham